Galvanoluminescence Is the emission of light produced by the passage of an electric current through an appropriate electrolyte in which an electrode, made of certain metals such as aluminium or tantalum, has been immersed. An example being the electrolysis of sodium bromide (NaBr).

Luminescence
Materials science